Diadegma patruele is a wasp first described by Holmgren in 1868. It is found in South Africa.

See also 
Parasitoid wasp

References 

patruele
Insects described in 1868
Taxa named by August Holmgren